Jack Frost (born John Dempsey in Jersey City, New Jersey, United States) is the American guitarist/founder of the heavy metal band Seven Witches and also a part of The Bronx Casket Company. Frost is also known for playing guitar on Savatage's tour in support of Poets and Madmen in 2001 and 2002 before being dismissed from the band for unspecified reasons. He is currently touring in  Anthrax vocalist Joey Belladonna's backing band. He also played in a New Jersey-based cover band called Diesel which features Taz Marazz of Seven Witches, Mike Lepond of Symphony X on bass and Jim Pepe on lead vocals.

Discography

Solo artist 
 2003 - Raise Your Fist to Metal
 2005 - Out in the Cold

With Frost Bite 
 1994 - Icy Hell
 1996 - Secret Admirer
 1997 - Carousel

With Seven Witches 
 1998 - Seven Witches
 1999 - Second War in Heaven
 2000 - City of Lost Souls
 2002 - Xiled to Infinity and One
 2003 - Passage to the Other Side
 2004 - Year of the Witch
 2005 - Amped
 2007 - Deadly Sins
 2011 - Call Upon the Wicked
 2013 - Rebirth
 2015 - The Way of the Wicked

With The Bronx Casket Company 
 1999 - Bronx Casket Company
 2000 - Sweet Home Transylvania
 2005 - Hellectric
 2011 - Antihero

With SPEED 
 1999 - Powertrip Pigs

With Metalium 
 2000 - State of Triumph: Chapter Two

References

External links 
 Bronx Casket Company Official Website
 

American heavy metal guitarists
Living people
Musicians from Jersey City, New Jersey
Guitarists from New Jersey
Savatage members
American male guitarists
Seven Witches members
20th-century American guitarists
Metalium members
Year of birth missing (living people)
Candlelight Records artists
Noise Records artists